Tushar Pandey (born 22 November 1991) is an Indian actor working predominantly in Bollywood. Graduate of National School of Drama and London International School of Performing Arts, he is best known for his role of Mummy in the 2019 film Chhichhore. Pandey debuted in 2015 in the psychological thriller Beyond Blue: An Unnerving Tale of a Demented Mind which premiered at the Marché du Film in 68th annual Cannes Film Festival.

Early life and education 
Tushar Pandey was born on 22 November, 1991 and brought up in Delhi, India. Tushar's interest in performing arts began during his school days at Montfort Senior Secondary School.  He participated in stage plays, music and sports competitions throughout his school years. After finishing school he got admission in English (H) at Kirori Mal College through the special theatre admission (selection for exceptional talent in arts) and was part of 'The Players', theatre society of the college.

Tushar's professional training and career started at the  National School of Drama., one of the most prestigious theatre schools in Asia. Furthermore, he is trained in physical theatre and finished his advanced training from London International School of Performing Arts, London and was awarded Inlaks Shivadasani Foundation International Scholarship.

Acting career 
Tushar's first film appearance was in Rang De Basanti, as one of the students auditioning for a documentary role. He acted in a supporting role in 2016 acclaimed film Pink alongside Amitabh Bachchan and Taapsee Pannu. In 2019, Rajshri Productions launched him in a lead role in their youth film Hum Chaar. Same year, he was seen in Chhichhore, alongside Sushant Singh Rajput and Shraddha Kapoor. The film was directed by Nitesh Tiwari and became one of the big hits of the year.

Filmography

References

External links 
 

Indian male film actors
Living people
Male actors in Hindi cinema
Year of birth missing (living people)